The 2021–22 season was the 117th season in the existence of 1. FSV Mainz 05 and the club's 13th consecutive season in the top flight of German football. In addition to the domestic league, Mainz participated in this season's edition of the DFB-Pokal.

Players

First-team squad

Out on loan

Transfers

In

Out

Pre-season and friendlies

Competitions

Overall record

Bundesliga

League table

Results summary

Results by round

Matches
The league fixtures were announced on 25 June 2021.

DFB-Pokal

References

1. FSV Mainz 05 seasons
1. FSV Mainz 05